The thirty-first government of Israel was formed by Ehud Olmert on 4 May 2006, following Kadima's victory in the March elections. His coalition initially included Labor, Shas and Gil, and held 67 of the 120 seats in the Knesset. The 11-seat Yisrael Beiteinu joined the coalition in November 2006, but left on 16 January 2008 in protest at peace talks with the Palestinian National Authority. With the inclusion of the Labor Party's Raleb Majadele as a Minister without Portfolio on 29 January 2007, it became the first Israeli cabinet to have a Muslim minister. The makeup of the coalition resulted in a center-left government.

The government held office until Benjamin Netanyahu formed the thirty-second government on 31 March 2009, following elections the month before.

Cabinet members

1 Peres left office when elected President.

2 Barak replaced Peretz when he defeated him in the party leadership election.

3 Pines-Paz resigned from the government in protest at the inclusion of Yisrael Beiteinu.

References

External links
Seventeenth Knesset: Government 31 Knesset website

 31
2006 establishments in Israel
2009 disestablishments in Israel
Cabinets established in 2006
Cabinets disestablished in 2009
2006 in Israeli politics
2007 in Israeli politics
2008 in Israeli politics
2009 in Israeli politics
 31
Ehud Olmert